Andy Maar (born December 19, 1983) is a former Luxembourgish politician.

He used to be treasurer and later general secretary of the Pirate Party of Luxembourg (Piratepartei Lëtzebuerg) and the former national president of the ADR's youth organization ADRenalin.

He studied telecommunication electronics in the Lycée technique d'Esch-sur-Alzette.

Political career 

In 2010 Maar was elected as the national president of ADRenalin.

In 2011 he was re-elected by the national congress of ADRenalin.

Additionally, he was a member both of the national board and of the executive committee of the ADR party. As a representative of Adrenalin, a youth organisation of a party which is a member of the Alliance of European Conservatives and Reformists (AECR), he was himself the Luxembourgish delegate at the founding congress of the European Young Conservatives (EYC).

After the municipal elections of October 19, 2011, he and a large number of other members resigned from the ADRenalin national board due to political and ideological differences and on October 11, he left the party.

On October 29, 2011, at the national congress of the Pirate Party of Luxembourg, he was elected treasurer.

On November 24, 2013, he was elected as the general secretary.

References 

Luxembourgian politicians
Living people
1983 births